The 2018–19 George Washington Colonials men's basketball team represented George Washington University during the 2018–19 NCAA Division I men's basketball season. The Colonials were led by third-year head coach Maurice Joseph and played their home games at the Charles E. Smith Center in Washington, D.C. as members of the Atlantic 10 Conference. They finished the season9–24, 4–14 in A-10 play to finish in a tie for 12th place. As the No. 12 seed, they defeated Massachusetts in the first round of the A-10 tournament before losing to George Mason in the second round.

George Washington parted ways with Maurice Joseph on March 15, 2019 after three seasons and an overall record of 44–57. On March 21, the school hired Siena head coach Jamion Christian as the new head coach.

Previous season
The Colonials finished the 2017–18 season with a record of 15–18, 7–11 in A-10 play to finish in a three-way tie for 10th place. They defeated Fordham in the first round of the A-10 tournament before losing to Saint Louis in the second round.

Offseason

Departures

Incoming transfers

2018 recruiting class

Honors and awards
Street & Smith's Preseason Awards
 All-Defense - Terry Nolan Jr.

Roster

Schedule and results

|-
!colspan=9 style=|Exhibition

|-
!colspan=12 style=| Non-conference regular season

|-
!colspan=12 style=| Atlantic 10 regular season

|-
!colspan=9 style=|Atlantic 10 tournament

See also
 2018–19 George Washington Colonials women's basketball team

References

George Washington Colonials men's basketball seasons
George Washington